Shepard Broad (July 8, 1906 – November 6, 2001) was a Belarusian-American banker, lawyer, and philanthropist.

Early life and immigration to America
Shepard Broad was born in Pinsk, in the Minsk Governorate of the Russian Empire (present-day Belarus) as Szmuel Bobrowice. He trained as a tailor's apprentice, but Eastern Europe offered little opportunity to a young Jewish boy. At the age of 14, he joined the mass migration to North America. Hoping to land in New York, he ended up in Quebec. Canadian immigration authorities planned to send him back to Belarus, but his plight came to the attention of Adolph Stark, president of the Canadian-Jewish Immigration Society. Stark took him home.
Stark offered to adopt the boy, but Broad was determined to find an uncle in New York. Stark gave him a train ticket and Broad made it to New York in 1920. He knew no English at the time.

Education and professional career
Shepard Broad received his law degree from New York Law School in 1927, and he was admitted to the New York State Bar in 1928. From 1928 through 1940, Mr. Broad practiced law in New York City.

In August 1940, Mr. Broad was admitted to The Florida Bar and opened a law office in Miami Beach, Florida, the next year. On January 1, 1946, he founded the law firm of Broad and Cassel, which continues to this day with offices throughout Florida.

In 1946, Mr. Broad helped organize the Bank of Hollywood Hills and the North Shore Bank of Miami Beach. The following year, he helped establish the American Savings and Loan Association of Florida. He subsequently served as the president of the Mercantile National Bank of Miami Beach. He assisted in founding the Bank of Miramar, Florida.

Civic activities and philanthropy

Involvement with Israel
He and 21 other Jewish men met in a New York City apartment in 1945 and agreed on an audacious plan to help create a homeland for the world's Jewish people. Among his colleagues: David Ben-Gurion, who later became Israel's first prime minister. As World War II drew to an end, Broad, Ben-Gurion and their colleagues met in New York City and created an underground infrastructure to raise funds for Israel, provide weapons for its eventual 1947–1949 Palestine war and help Holocaust survivors and others reach what was then called Palestine.

Bay Harbor Islands, Florida
He envisioned apartment complexes, single-family homes, golf courses, and shops. The $600,000 asking price seemed out of reach, so Broad traded his interest,  floors, of the downtown Biscayne Building for the swamp. He sketched the plans for what he called Bay Harbor Islands, designing it in two pieces. One piece for single family and one for multiple family. His vision was realized and the result was single-family homes on the western island, condos and rental apartment on the eastern island.

The town was incorporated in 1947 and Broad was elected to 26 consecutive one-year terms as mayor. His pay: $1 a year.

When he finally relinquished the job, he reminisced about the first election, one that was uninhibited by complications like voters. Broad joked:

"Shepard's Folly"
Also in 1947, the Legislature authorized him to build a causeway at 125th Street and Biscayne Boulevard. The $2.5 million road was to be financed by self-liquidating bonds without expense to taxpayers. His detractors dubbed the causeway "Shepard's Folly," but he persevered and it was completed in 1951. The bridge now carries the name of the Broad Causeway.

Educational institutions
Shepard Broad's other community activities include serving as a member of the Board of Governors at the Shepard Broad Law Center of Nova Southeastern University, earning honorary degrees from Nova University and Barry University, participating in the leadership of several hospitals, and endowing the Shepard and Ruth Broad Center for the Performing Arts of Barry University.

Shepard Broad and his wife Ruth, through the legacy of The Shepard Broad Foundation, 
Inc., have given generous support to major universities and hospitals throughout the world including: Florida International University, 
Barry University, University of Florida, 
Florida State University and the Shepard Broad Law Center
at Nova Southeastern University.

In 1995, he donated $174,350 for computer equipment at the new Ruth K. Broad Bay Harbor Elementary School, which was named for his late wife.

Health care
He was also a benefactor to Mount Sinai Medical Center & Miami Heart Institute.

References

1906 births
2001 deaths
People from Bay Harbor Islands, Florida
Belarusian Jews
Polish emigrants to the United States
American people of Belarusian-Jewish descent
American bankers
20th-century American lawyers
American Zionists
Nova Southeastern University
20th-century American philanthropists